The 1919 Campeonato Carioca, the fourteenth edition of the annual football championship of the state of Rio de Janeiro, Brazil, kicked off on June 8, 1919 and ended on January 6, 1920. It was organized by LMDT (Liga Metropolitana de Desportos Terrestres, or Metropolitan Land Sports League). Ten teams participated. Fluminense won the title for the 8th time. Carioca was relegated.

Participating teams

System 
The tournament would be disputed in a double round-robin format, with the team with the most points winning the title. The team with the fewest points would dispute a playoff against the champions of the second level.

Championship

Relegation playoffs 
The last-placed team, Carioca, would dispute a playoff against Palmeiras, champions of the Second Level. Carioca won the first match by 4-1, but the league annulled the match after it was found that Carioca had fielded two ineligible players. A rematch was held in March 1920, which ended with Palmeiras winning by 4-2 and being promoted to the first level.

References 

Campeonato Carioca seasons
Carioca